Caroline S. Wagner (5 June 1955, Rhode Island) is an American academic and author specializing in public policy related to science, technology, and innovation. As of 2011, Wagner holds the endowed chair in international affairs named for Milton A. Wolf and Roslyn Z. Wolf at the John Glenn College of Public Affairs, The Ohio State University, Columbus, Ohio.

Education 
She earned her doctorate from the University of Amsterdam in Science and Technology Dynamics, under Dutch sociologist Loet Leydesdorff; a Master of Arts degree in Science, Technology and Public Policy from George Washington University; and a Bachelor of Arts from Trinity College, Washington, DC.

Career 
In 2018, Wagner authored a book, The Collaborative Era in Science: Governing the Network, by Palgrave Publishers.

This work follows an earlier book, The New Invisible College: Science for Development, Brookings Press, 2008.

Other work has pointed out that international collaboration creates a conundrum for national governments because research is taking place at so many more places across the globe than was the case in the late 20th century. Governments should seek to scan and reintegrate knowledge in addition to investing in national or regional science and technology, according to Wagner. National planners need to increase awareness of the international system of science and technology. For example, nations that have greater openness to international collaboration and the mobility of scientists tend to have a greater impact in science and technology. 

At The RAND Corporation, Wagner was deputy to the director of the Science and Technology Policy Institute. She has served on the staff of the US Congress, the Office of Technology Assessment, and the US Department of State. She was an advisor to the World Bank’s Knowledge Report and other projects, United Nations Millennium Development Project, the Organization for Economic Cooperation and Development, and several governments. An Elected Fellow of the American Association for the Advancement of Science and is an officer for Section X; she is an editor of the refereed journal Science & Public Policy published by Oxford University Press. Wagner received a Rockefeller Foundation grant to write The New Invisible College: Science for Development published by Brookings Institution Press in 2008. In 2015, Wagner was elected to the Council on Foreign Relations. She serves on the Board of Advisors for CRDF Global, and she is an advisor to the Global Knowledge Initiative. Wagner was a Fulbright Foundation distinguished visitor to Israel in 2006.

References

1955 births
Living people
University of Amsterdam alumni
George Washington University alumni
RAND Corporation people
Trinity Washington University alumni
Ohio State University faculty
Fellows of the American Association for the Advancement of Science
Academics from Rhode Island
Place of birth missing (living people)